Rebeca Grynspan Mayufis (born 14 December 1955) is a Costa Rican economist who has been serving as Secretary General of the United Nations Conference on Trade and Development (UNCTAD) since 13 September 2021.

Grynspan previously served as Ibero-American Secretary General (2014–2021) and as UN Under-Secretary-General and the Associate Administrator of the United Nations Development Programme (2010–2014). She previously served as Director of UNDP's Regional Bureau for Latin America and the Caribbean, appointed to the position by United Nations Secretary-General Kofi Annan in December 2005. She was the Vice President of Costa Rica from 1994 to 1998.

Early life and education
Grynspan is the daughter of Manuel Grynspan Burstin and Sara Mayufis Schapiro, immigrants from Poland of Jewish ancestry. Grynspan obtained a Bachelor of Science degree with a major in economics from the University of Costa Rica and later on a Master of Arts in Economics from Sussex University.

Early career
Early in her career, Grynspan was a professor and researcher at the Economic Science Research Institute at the University of Costa Rica.

Political career

Career in national politics
Grynspan has held various official functions in her country such as Vice-President of Costa Rica from 1994 to 1998 and concurrently as Housing Minister from 1996 to 1998, Coordinating Minister of Economy from 1995 to 1996, Coordinating Minister of Social Affairs from 1994 to 1998 and Vice-Minister of Finance from 1986 to 1988.

Career with the United Nations
Grynspan was appointed by UN Secretary-General António Guterres to be the eighth secretary-general of United Nations Conference on Trade and Development (UNCTAD) on 13 September 2021. She is the first woman to hold this position in the history of the organization.

Grynspan served as Director of the Subregional Headquarters in Mexico of the Economic Commission for Latin America and the Caribbean (ECLAC) from 2001 to 2006, where she also served as Co-Chair of the International Food Policy Research Institute’s Executive Board. She was also a member of the UN  Millennium Project’s Task Force on Poverty and Economic Development and of the UN High-Level Panel on Financing for Development.

Grynspan served as Assistant-Secretary-General and Regional Director for Latin America and the Caribbean at United Nations Development Programme (UNDP) from 2006 to 2010. In 2010, she was appointed by UN Secretary-General Ban Ki-moon to the position of UN Under-Secretary-General and the Associate Administrator, serving under the leadership of Helen Clark.

Grynspan is a member of the Inter-American Development Bank's (IDB) Program for the Support of Women´s Leadership and Representation (PROLEAD); She is former vice president of the board of directors of the International Food Policy Research Institute (IFPRI) based in Washington, D.C.

SEGIB
Grynspan was unanimously elected Secretary General of the Ibero-American Secretary General (Secretaria General Iberoamericana), SEGIB, in a special meeting of the Ministers of External Relations on February 24, 2014 in Mexico City, in which representatives of all 22 member countries were present. She succeeded in the office Enrique V. Iglesias who had held the position since the establishment of SEGIB in 2005.

In September 2016, Grynspan was appointed by United Nations Secretary-General Ban Ki-moon to serve as member of the Lead Group of the Scaling Up Nutrition Movement.

In early 2021, Grynspan was appointed by the G20 to the High Level Independent Panel (HLIP) on financing the global commons for pandemic preparedness and response, co-chaired by Ngozi Okonjo-Iweala, Tharman Shanmugaratnam and Lawrence Summers.

Return to the United Nations
In June 2021, following consultations with member states, United Nations Secretary-General António Guterres proposed Grynspan as the next Secretary-General of the United Nations Conference on Trade and Development (UNCTAD) in Geneva.

Recognition 
In 2014 and 2015, Grynspan was recognized as one of the 50 leading intellectuals of Latin America and, in 2017, she received a Forbes Excellence Award and was granted the Grand Cross of Civil Order of Alfonso X “The Wise” by the Spanish Government. In recognition of her professional achievements, the University of Extremadura and the European University conferred her an honorary doctorate.

Other activities 
 World Economic Forum (WEF), Member of the Global Councils on the Future of International Governance, Public-Private Cooperation & Sustainable Development, and the Poverty and Sustainable Development 
 UNICEF Scaling-up Nutrition (SUN) Movement, Member of the Steering Committee 
 Society for International Development (SID), Member of the Governing Council 
 Global Institute for Sustainable Prosperity (GISP), Member of the Advisory Board
 Inter-American Dialogue, Member
 International Economic Forum of the Americas (IEFA), Member of the Advisory Board
 International Labour Organization (ILO), Member of the Global Commission on the Future of Work
 Fourth Sector Group, Co-Chair 
 Women Political Leaders Global Forum, Member
 W20, Member
 In 2021 the president of Argentina, Alberto Fernandez, named Mrs Grynspan special international advisor to the Economic and Social Council of Argentina
 In 2021 became member of the G20 High Level Independent Panel on Financing the Global Commons for Pandemic Preparedness and Response

References

External links 

Rebeca Grynspan takes over as head of UNCTAD
UNCTAD (Biographical note)
UNCTAD (Speeches and Statements)

|-

|-

1955 births
Living people
Alumni of the University of Sussex
Costa Rican people of Polish-Jewish descent
Government ministers of Costa Rica
People from San José, Costa Rica
United Nations Development Programme officials
Vice presidents of Costa Rica
Recipients of the Civil Order of Alfonso X, the Wise
Women vice presidents
Costa Rican officials of the United Nations
Costa Rican Jews
Members of the Inter-American Dialogue